Bidwell is a hamlet located within the Parish of Houghton Regis in Central Bedfordshire, England.

Originally a small rural settlement, Bidwell is now a housing development area of the town.

Magic Maps

Hamlets in Bedfordshire
Central Bedfordshire District